Pinato is an Italian surname. Notable people with the surname include:

Davide Pinato (born 1964), Italian footballer and coach
Fausto Pinato (born 1977), Brazilian politician and lawyer
Marco Pinato (born 1995), Italian footballer

Italian-language surnames